Slingo is an online single and multi-player game that combines elements of slots and bingo (the name is a portmanteau of the two games). The game was created by New Jersey real estate developer, Sal Falciglia Sr. in 1994, who also founded the company Slingo, Inc. to create and market games based on the Slingo theme. In July 2013, RealNetworks acquired Slingo for $15.6 million, and in July 2015 RealNetworks announced that it would sell Slingo to London-based gaming company Gaming Realms. Slingo has since become popular in the UK online gambling industry, with many sites now hosting the game, including its various iterations of which there are currently 12. These are known collectively and individually as ‘Slingo Originals’ and were developed by Gaming Realms’ development and publishing branch of the same name. Both the games and brand have enjoyed commercial success, and have been praised for their playability and originality.

Play
A player has 20 turns to "spin" the numbers below his or her bingo card. Five numbers appear, and if they are found on the card, they can be marked off.

During the game, other special items may show up in the number spots below the card. Jokers are wild, and can be used to mark off any number in the column in which it appears. A joker in the center (N) column may sometimes become a Super Joker, which can be placed anywhere on the board. (When it appears, the Super Joker must be played first, before any other numbers.)

Devils also occasionally appear during the course of the game. If a devil appears in place of a number, the player's score is cut in half. Frequently though, a cherub appears and cancels the devil's effects by shooting it with an arrow.

Other special items include coins, which grant automatic points to the player, and Free Spins. The last four spins of the game (17, 18, 19, and 20) must be bought using points. A player may use accumulated free spins in place of the fee for any of the spins.

Time limits are imposed on spins as well. If a player does not begin his spin within a time limit, he loses that spin. If a player does not mark off all possible numbers or jokers within the time limit, those are considered lost.

At the end of the game, the winner is the player who has the most points.

Spinoffs and ports
Outside of internet gaming, there have been other Slingo products, including versions of the game for PC and cell phones, and as a handheld electronic game (which features no Super Jokers, multiple Joker bonuses or cherubs due to technical limitations).

Slingo has also been spun off into Slingo-themed slot machines, and scratch-off lottery tickets.

A game show version of Slingo was filmed in The Philippines and Hosted by Joey de Leon on ABC5 in 2007. In 2008, an unsold pilot was produced in the United States, hosted by Michael Burger.

Scoring
Points are earned from Slingo CD-Rom to Slingo Deluxe:

Marking a number on the board (200 points)
Covered five numbers in a row either horizontally, vertically, or diagonally (1,000 points)
Gold coin on the reel (1,000 points)
Spinning three, four, or five jokers in one spin (super joker counts) (3 = 1,000 points, 4 = 2,500 points, 5 = 10,000 points) This bonus didn't exist until the millennium version.
clearing the entire card, which earns a bonus proportional to the number of spins used:
Spin 0 - 16,000 Points (it is impossible to fill a Slingo card in less than 5 spins unless you have increasing spins freezing)
Spin 1 - 15,500 Points
Spins 2 - 15,000 Points
Spins 3 - 14,500 Points
Spins 4 - 14,000 Points
Spins 5 - 13,500 Points
Spins 6 - 13,000 Points
Spins 7 - 12,500 Points
Spins 8 - 12,000 Points
Spins 9 - 11,500 Points
Spins 10 - 11,000 Points
Spins 11 - 10,500 Points
Spins 12 - 10,000 Points
Spins 13 - 9,500 Points
Spins 14 - 9,000 Points
Spins 15 - 8,500 Points
Spins 16 - 8,000 Points
Spins 17 - 7,500 Points
Spins 18 - 7,000 Points
Spins 19 - 6,500 Points
Spins 20 - 6,000 Points

Points are deducted for:
One of the reel landed on devil (cuts the score in half)
Paying for the last four spins
spin 17 - 500 points
spin 18 - 1,000 points
spin 19 - 1,500 points
spin 20 - 2,000 points

Slingo Quest-Latest
Points are earned from Slingo Quest to Slingo Supreme 2:

making a number on the board without speed bonus (200 points)
making a number on the board with speed bonus (300, 400, 500, 700, etc.)
clearing lines of numbers either horizontally, vertically, diagonally, or with bounce (1,000, 2,000, 4,000, 8,000, etc.)
spinning three, four or five jokers in one spin (super joker counts) (3 = 3,000 points, 4 = 8,000 points, 5 = 15,000, points 6 = 24,000 points, 7 = 35,000 points)
opens a treasure without devil (earns the score by double)
clearing the entire card, which earns a bonus proportional to the number of spins used since Slingo Quest:
Spin 5: 47,500 points (it is impossible to fill the Slingo card in less than 5 spins unless either Cell Jokers, Power Shot, Instant Slingos, Speed Slingo, Cell Marbles, and/or Exploding Slingos are active)
Spin 6: 45,000 points
Spin 7: 42,500 points
Spin 8: 40,000 points
Spin 9: 37,500 points
Spin 10: 35,000 points
Spin 11: 32,500 points
Spin 12: 30,000 points
Spin 13: 27,500 points
Spin 14: 25,000 points
Spin 15: 22,500 points
Spin 16: 20,000 points
Spin 17: 17,500 points
Spin 18: 15,000 points
Spin 19: 12,500 points
Spin 20: 10,000 points
Points are deducted from Slingo Quest-Slingo Quest: Hawaii:
hitting a devil (cuts the score in 10% 20%, 30% 40%, or 50% unless you have Devil Protection)
opens a treasure to appear devil (cuts the score in half)
paying for the last four spins since Slingo Quest
 spin 17 - 10%
 spin 18 - 20%
 spin 19 - 30%
 spin 20 - 40%
Points are earned since Slingo Supreme:
winning a minigame (earns the score by double, half, or quarter)
Points are deducted since Slingo Supreme:
losing a minigame (cuts the score by 100%, half, or quarter unless you have Devil Protection and/or Lucky)
Points are earned since Slingo Supreme 2:
making a number on the board after starting a spin (200 points)
making a number on the board with speed bonus (250, 300, 400, 500, 700, 1000, 1200, 1500, 2000, 2500, 3500, 5000)
clearing lines of numbers either horizontally, vertically, diagonally, bouncing or wrapping (1,000, 2,000, 3,000, 5,000, etc.)

Millennium and Classic versions
For a while, the multiplayer version of Slingo was only available through AOL. A single-player version aimed at children on slingo.com was the closest members could get to the real thing. However, for the new millennium, Slingo launched a new version with newer graphics than the old game, and it had a resemblance to the graphics of the kid's version of the game. Also, the bonuses for three or more jokers were added into the game, and the Devil and Cherub cartoons were revamped.  Another revision was done along with a name change in September 2009 to Slingo Classic.  This included another graphics update.

Game modes
Some of the CD-ROM versions of the game had different versions of Slingo with slightly different rules:

 Classic Slingo - The original version of the Slingo game.
 Mixed Matrix Slingo - This version has all the numbers in random locations, not just limited to the traditional column. Spin Numbers can be used no matter which column it is on the board, however Jokers still can only choose numbers of the column it is under.  This is a more time-based game, since it will take longer to try and search which numbers where hit and where they are.
 Duel Slingo - Play against the computer in a 2-player game board.  Both the player & computer take turns alternating to clear the same board and compete to see which will get the highest score.
 Giant Slingo - Same as the original, but a new 'Giant' item is added to the game.  If a giant is earned during a 'Spin' and once you choose the numbers or Jokers you can, the Giant will Spin again (except the column he was under) for 4 new numbers on the same turn.  This makes it easier to clear the board with basically 2 spins on the same turn.
 Super Squares Slingo - Same as the original, however during each Spin, up to 5 of the numbers on the board will randomly turn Red each turn, indicating a 'Super Square'.  Each super square is worth 1800 point bonus if that number is marked & another point bonus is added to your score if you earn a slingo from that square.  Also, as well a normal Jokers for normal squares (if used on a super square, it will only count as a normal number), Red highlighted 'Super Jokers' can be used to mark super squares for the full bonus (it can also be used on normal numbers if no super square is in that column).

Computer versions

There have been some stand alone computer versions of the Slingo game.

 Slingo CD-ROM (Hasbro Interactive) 1998 
 Slingo Deluxe (Funkitron) 2002 
 Slingo Quest (Funkitron) 2006 - Winner of the 2006 People's Choice Zeeby Award for Best Card, Board, or Mah Jong Game 
 Slingo Quest - Hawaii (Funkitron) 2008 
 Slingo Supreme (Funkitron) 2008
 Slingo Mystery: Who's Gold (Funkitron) 2009 
 Slingo Mystery 2: The Golden Escape 2010
Slingo Quest - Egypt (Funkitron) 2010
 Slingo Quest - Amazon (Funkitron) 2011
 Slingo Supreme 2 (Funkitron) 2012

Console versions

In December 2008, Slingo appeared on the Nintendo DS with a version of Slingo Quest. This version used the DS's touch screen  to duplicate the clicking of a mouse to match numbers. The game was published by Mumbo Jumbo.

Mobile versions
There have been two iterations of Slingo for play on mobile phones.

Slingo-To-Go from SuperHappyFunFun/Kayak Interactive (now part of Oberon Media) 2005 - The game featured direct play between the users of the mobile game and players on Slingo.com.
Slingo Quest Mobile (Slingo Bingo in EU) from SuperHappyFunFun/Iplay 2007 -  This is the mobile version of the Zeeby Award Winning Slingo Quest

Casino versions
Slingo has partnered with high-profile casino organizations such as AC Coin & Slot, IGT - International Game Technology, Spielo / Gtech, Planet Bingo, Sunkist Graphics, Gamelogic, and United States Playing Card Company to bring the Slingo game play to the casino floor.

Locations

Bally's Atlantic City
Caesars Atlantic City
Paris Las Vegas
Harrah's Reno

Games currently on casino floors include:
Slingo Bonus Reel Slots
Slingo Video Slots
Brasil Slingo Video Slots
Triple Slingo Jackpot
Bonus Bet 21
Slingo Bonus Deluxe
Slingo Bonus Deluxe Community
Slingo Classic Bonus

Handheld version
The Slingo LCD handheld game was created in partnership with Tiger Electronics in 1998. It plays similarly to the Classic & Millenium versions of Slingo, but it lacks Cherubs, Super Jokers, and multiple Joker bonuses due to technical limitations.

References

External links
Official Website

1994 video games
Flash games
Mobile games
Puzzle video games
Video games developed in the United States
Windows games
RealNetworks